Ariathisa is a genus of moths of the family Noctuidae. The genus was erected by Francis Walker in 1865.

Species
Ariathisa abyssinia (Guenée, 1852)
Ariathisa angulata Gaede, 1935
Ariathisa semiluna (Hampson, 1909)
Ariathisa alychnodes Turner, 1939

References

Acronictinae